The Bukit Peninsula (Indonesian: Semenanjung Bukit) is at the southern end of the island of Bali, Indonesia. It is traditionally considered to be the entire area south of Jimbaran beach.  Unlike the bulk of Bali, it features a dry, arid and stony landscape.  It is administered under Kuta South District. Bukit means 'hill' in Indonesian.

Notes

External links

 

Landforms of Bali
Peninsulas of Indonesia
Badung Regency